Yvonne Dausab is a Namibian lawyer and politician. She is the Minister of Justice of Namibia since March 2020.

Early life and career
Dausab grew up in Katutura, a segregated area for Blacks in Windhoek. She completed A Shipena Secondary School as the head girl. Dausab completed secondary school not long after Namibia's independence, and went on to study a BA in Law and LLB at the University of the Western Cape and an LL.M. with a specialization in Human Rights and African Democratisation at the University of Pretoria thanks to various scholarships.

Dausab was admitted as a legal practitioner of the High Court of Namibia in April 2000 at the age of 25. She then worked in human rights at an African NGO based in Lusaka, Zambia for five years before returning to Namibian and joining a private law practice. In 2007, Dausab joined the University of Namibia as a part-time law lecturer. In 2009, she received a faculty position and was later appointed the deputy dean.

Political career
Dausab left academia in 2015 when she was appointed the chairperson of the Law Reform and Development Commission. in 2015 by Namibian president Hage Geingob. In March 2020, she was appointed Minister of Justice, replacing Sacky Shanghala.

External links
 Official Twitter

References

Living people
Year of birth missing (living people)
Women government ministers of Namibia
Justice ministers of Namibia
University of the Western Cape alumni
University of Pretoria alumni
Academic staff of the University of Namibia
Politicians from Windhoek